Steven E. Sodergren is a historian and University Professor employed by Norwich University. His book The Army of the Potomac in the Overland & Petersburg Campaigns was the recipient of the 2018 Colby Award.

References 

Living people
American military historians
21st-century American historians
21st-century American male writers
Norwich University faculty
Year of birth missing (living people)
American male non-fiction writers